Sophie Morgan (born in 1997) is an English singer and songwriter.

Born in Liverpool, Morgan was raised in Rainhill and Widnes, Cheshire in Northwest England. She was brought up with an extensive musical education, ranging from Nick Drake and Van Morrison, and later to Joni Mitchell and Carole King.

After a chance meeting with The Verve's Simon Jones, whilst singing in church at a friend's wedding, Morgan began skipping school and recording in Jones' Chester studio.

She released her first single "Marionette" in 2016, followed six months later by "Quietly", which picked up support from BBC Music Introducing and BBC 6 Music along the way.
 
Morgan's debut EP "Annie" was released on 6 October 2017. After applying for the rights to record a version of "The Whole of the Moon", which features on the EP, Morgan was invited on tour with The Waterboys across the UK and Europe through the autumn of 2017.

Morgan's second EP "Sons & Daughters" was released on 21 September 2018. Her single "Sons & Daughters", taken from the EP, received critical acclaim for the quality of her voice and simplicity of its delivery.

She performed in 'the Molen, de Ster' in Utrecht (October 2018) and at House of St Barnabas, London (November 2018).

In 2019, she performed at Warrington Music Festival and at Ronnie Scott's.

References

External links
Official website

1997 births
Living people
English women singer-songwriters
21st-century English women singers
21st-century English singers